This battle took place on 4 June 1565 between an Allied fleet of 33 Danish and Lübecker ships, under Trolle, and a Swedish fleet of perhaps 49 ships, under Klas Horn. Afterward, the Danes retired to Køge Bay, south of Copenhagen, where Trolle died of his wounds on 25 June. His Second, Jørgen Brahe, died of fever on 28 June.

Ships involved

Denmark-Norway/Lübeck 

 Jegermesther 90 (flag)
 Merkurius (Second in command Jørgen Brahe)
 Svenske Jomfru (Erik Rud)
 30 others

Sweden 

 St Erik 90 (flag)
 Finska Svan 82
 Svenska Hektor 87 (Per Bagge)
 Herkules 81
 Engel 49
 Pelikan
 Troilus 44 (Shenk)
 Fuchs (ex-Lübecker)?
 41 or so others

References 
 Kloth, Herbert: "Lübecks Seekriegswesen in der Zeit des nordischen 7-jährigen Krieges 1563–1570", Zeitschrift des Vereines für lübeckische Geschichte und Altertumskunde, Vol. 21 (1923), pp. 1–51, 185–256 plus Vol. 22 (1923–25), pp. 121–52 & 325–79

1565 in Denmark
1565
History of Lübeck
Conflicts in 1565